The Warsaw Jewish Film Festival is an annual Jewish film festival held in Warsaw, Poland. Organized in 2003 by American film director , it was the first one of this type on Poland, and one of the first and largest in the Eastern Europe.

The main idea of the festival is to present both the contemporary and traditional culture of the Jewish people. It is the continuation of the cultural tradition started with the Jewish Culture Festival in Kraków in 1988.

The festival is a member of the Association of European Jewish Film Festivals, which was established during the World Conference of Jewish Film Festival Directors in Boston in 2004.

Awards
The festival issues annual awards for films on Jewish topics. Its Grand Prix is called "David's Camera", sketched on the festival's logo. It is issued separately for categories of full-length films and of shorts.

Winners

2018
 (director),  (writer), Etgar Keret: Based on a True Story (2017). David Camera Award Best Documentary Feature
Brandon Gross (director), Skyler Gross (director), On My Way Out: The Secret Life of Nani and Popi (2017),  about Roman (Popi) and Ruth (Nani) Blank, Holocaust survivors. David Camera Award, Best Short Documentary

2006
Roman Polanski David's Camera Award for his film The Pianist and for his lifetime contribution in cinematography.

See also
Jewish Motifs International Film Festival, Warsaw

References

External links
 

2003 establishments in Poland
2003 film festivals
2003 festivals in Europe
Culture in Warsaw
Events in Warsaw
Film festivals in Poland
Jewish film festivals in Europe
Jews and Judaism in Warsaw
Recurring events established in 2003